Zhang Yufei (born 1988 in Dalian, Liaoning) is a Chinese gymnast. She was known for performing at a high technical level, but was held back in her career by repeated injuries. She is one of only a handful of female gymnasts to attempt and successfully complete the 'Mo Salto'.

Life after gymnastics
Zhang Yufei moved to San Diego, CA, in August 2009. She worked as a gymnastics coach for North County Gymnastics and is now a coach with SD United Training Center, San Diego California.

References

External links
Yaeger to Pak – Zhang Yufei
Zhang Yufei 2005 Chinese National Games Floor
Zhang Yufei 2005 World Championships

1988 births
Living people
Chinese female artistic gymnasts
Sportspeople from Dalian
Gymnasts from Liaoning
21st-century Chinese women